Saeed Ahmad Palanpuri (also written as Saʻīd Aḥmad Pālanpūrī) (1940 – 19 May 2020), was an Indian Sunni Muslim scholar and author who served as Shaykh al-Hadith and  Principal of Darul Uloom Deoband. A number of his books are required readings in Darul Uloom Deoband.

Biography
Palanpuri was born in 1940 in Kaleda village, Vadgam then in the Palanpur State. He studied at the Mazahir Uloom and then  attended the Darul Uloom Deoband, where he graduated in traditional dars-e-nizami studies.

Palanpuri joined Jamia Ashrafiya in Rander as a teacher in 1965 and taught there for about ten years. He was appointed as a teacher of Darul Uloom Deoband in 1973 at the recommendation of Manzur Nu'mani. In 2008, he succeeded Naseer Ahmad Khan as Shaykh al-Hadith and also served as Principal. His teaching career in Darul Uloom Deoband lasted for over 50 years.

Pratibha Patil awarded Palanpuri the President's Certificate of Honour on the 64th Independence Day of India.

Reaction towards Madrasa Board scheme

Palanpuri maintained the view that the Indian Government's Scheme to Provide Quality Education in Madrasas (SPQEM) will end in fiasco.

Literary works
Palanpuri's works include:
 Tafseer Hidayat al-Quran
 Mabadiyat-e-Fiqh
 Aap Fatwa Kaise Dein?
 Hurmat-e-Musahirat
 Dadhi awr Anbiya ki Sunnat
 Tehshiya Imdad al-Fatawa (Marginalia to Ashraf Ali Thanwi's 6 volume Imdad al-Fatawa).
 Tasheel Adilla-e-Kamilah (Commentary to Mahmud Hasan Deobandi's Adilla-e-Kamilah).
 Mashaheer Muhaddiseen, Fuqaha Kiram awr Tadhkirah Rawiyan-e-Kutb-e-Hadith
 Rahmatullahil Wasiah (5 volume commentary to Shah Waliullah Dehlawi's Hujjatullahil Balighah)

Death
Palanpuri had diabetes and was admitted to a Mumbai hospital, where he died on 19 May 2020 (25 Ramadan1441 AH). He was buried in a graveyard located in Oshiwara, Mumbai and only 15 people were allowed to attend his last rites.
Islamic scholars Abul Qasim Nomani, Arshad Madani, Mehmood Madani and Muhammad Sufyan Qasmi expressed grief at his death.

References

Bibliography 

 
 

2020 deaths
1942 births
Deobandis
Hadith scholars
Indian Sunni Muslim scholars of Islam
Muftis
Darul Uloom Deoband alumni
Academic staff of Darul Uloom Deoband
People from Banaskantha district
Mazahir Uloom alumni